Lysidice may refer to :

Feminine name 
Lysidice (mythology), the name of several minor Greek mythological figures

Genera 

 Lysidice (plant), a plant genus in the family Fabaceae
 Lysidice (annelid), an animal genus in the family Eunicidae